The Audi Rosemeyer is a concept car built  by Audi, shown initially at Autostadt and at various auto shows throughout Europe during 2000. Although it was never intended for production, its striking design and highly sporting nature drew considerable attention to the brand, and many potential buyers highly anticipated a production version, to no avail.

Information
The vehicle was designed to evoke emotion and garner attention, and was unique in that it combined elements of modern design with styling strongly resembling the former Auto Unions "Silver Arrows" Grand Prix racers, namely their 16-cylinder car driven by Bernd Rosemeyer, after which the car is named. The Rosemeyer concept is also highly reminiscent of the "Type 52" design study penned by Dr. Ferdinand Porsche and Dr. Erwin Komenda in the 1930s as a possible road going version of the Silver Arrows, which never saw production.

Powered by a large displacement, mid-mounted W16 engine, which develops  and featuring Audi's quattro permanent four-wheel drive system, the vehicle promised high performance to match its appearance.  It was ultimately deemed unfit for production, both because of extremely high projected production costs, and Audi's unwillingness to create in-house competition with Lamborghini, which Audi had purchased during the 1990s. In some ways, Audi's Gallardo-based R8 could be considered the Rosemeyer's successor, as it was derived from Audi's next supercar concept, the Le Mans quattro. In other ways, the Bugatti Veyron could be seen as the Rosemeyer's successor, drawing many design elements and the W16 engine from the Rosemeyer.

Specifications
 W16 5 valves/cyl mid-mounted engine

 @ 9,000 rpm
Top speed:  (projected, it couldn't be tested as the car wasn't functional)

Images

References

External links

Audi.com

Rosemeyer
Sports cars
2000s cars
Coupés
Rear mid-engine, all-wheel-drive vehicles
Retro-style automobiles